The Macedonia Baptist Church is a historic church located along LA 1036, about  north of Holden, Louisiana.

The church was organized in 1856, and the current building was constructed in 1898. The local community was settled by Anglo-Saxon Protestants during the 19th century.

The building was listed on the National Register of Historic Places on June 6, 1980.

See also
National Register of Historic Places listings in Livingston Parish, Louisiana

References

External links

Macedonia Baptist Church in National Park Service travel itinerary

English-American culture in Louisiana
Churches completed in 1898
19th-century Baptist churches in the United States
Baptist churches in Louisiana
Churches on the National Register of Historic Places in Louisiana
Churches in Livingston Parish, Louisiana
1856 establishments in Louisiana
National Register of Historic Places in Livingston Parish, Louisiana